Jaccard is a surname.

Jaccard may also refer to:

 Jaccard index, a statistic used for gauging the similarity and diversity of sample sets
 Jaccard loom, a power loom attachment that allows the manufacture of intricate patterns
 USS Jaccard (1944–1968), a U.S. Navy destroyer escort

See also
 Jacquard (disambiguation)